Provincial Highway 23 or Futung Highway is a highway starting at Fuli, Hualien and ending in Donghe, Taitung in Taiwan. The route length is 45.4km and connects Provincial Highway No. 9 and Provincial Highway No.11 by through Hai'an Range.

See also
 Highway system in Taiwan

External links

Highways in Taiwan
hak:Thòi-kiú-sien